For the author of 'On Childhood', born in Casablanca in 1919 see Abdelmajid Benjelloun

Abdelmajid Benjelloun (born in Fez, in 1944) is a Moroccan author, historian and poet. He is a specialist in the history of North Morocco. He taught Public Law at the Casablanca University since 1983. He is a member of 'la Maison de la poésie du Maroc' and professor in the history of international relations at the department of Law at the Mohammed V University in Rabat since 2002. Since 1999 he produces a French language program on Moroccan radio (RTM), Paroles d’esplanade. Benjelloun is also a painter.

References

Bibliography
Works on History
Approches du colonialisme espagnol et du mouvement nationaliste marocain (Khalifien. OKAD, Rabat, 1990)
le patriotisme marocain face au protectorat espagnol (Imp. El Maârif, Rabat, 1993
Fragments d'histoire du Rif oriental 1994
Pour une approche possible de l'histoire des institutions et des faits sociaux (Toubkal, 1997)
Le Nord du Maroc - l'Indépendance avant l'indépendance, Harmattan, 1997
Etudes d'histoire contemporaine du Maroc, Zaghouan, 2000 .
Literature
Etres et choses, le même silence, Saint-germain-des-pres, 1976
Qui tire sur les bretelles de ma respiration, ed. A die, 1991
Les sept cieux apparents du mot, Aphorismes poétiques, ed. E.m.a.j, 1993
 La mort d'un proche ne se termine jamais, Casablanca, éd. Toubkal, 1998
Anthologie poétique, Flammes Vives, 2000
 Mama, (auto-biographical novel) with an introduction by William Cliff, Paris, éd. du Rocher, coll. Anatolia, 2002
L'éternité ne penche que du côté de l'amour  (William Blake and co, 2002)
 Hassane l’andalou, ou l’étoile de la manquante était bien allumée, Rabat, éd. Racines, 2007

External links
Bibliomonde (in French)  (retrieved 06-18-2008) This site mistakenly names 'On Childhood' as a novel of this author.

20th-century Moroccan historians
Academic staff of the University of Hassan II Casablanca
20th-century Moroccan poets
1944 births
Living people
People from Fez, Morocco
Academic staff of Mohammed V University
21st-century Moroccan poets
21st-century Moroccan historians